Ah, Wilderness! is a 1935 American comedy-drama film adaptation of the 1933 Eugene O'Neill play of the same name. Directed by Clarence Brown, the film stars Wallace Beery and features Lionel Barrymore, Eric Linden, Cecilia Parker, Spring Byington, and a young Mickey Rooney. Rooney stars as Richard in MGM's musical remake Summer Holiday (1948).

Plot
June 1906 in an unnamed New England town. 17-year-old Richard Miller is about to graduate and go to Yale. He already feels worldly wise, thanks to reading Shaw, Wilde, The Rubáiyát of Omar Khayyam, Swinburne and Marxist tracts. He adores the neighborhood girl Muriel McComber, but she is afraid of being kissed.

Richard’s father, newspaper editor Nat Miller, is a kind, wise man. Richard has three siblings: older brother Arthur home from Yale; sister, Mildred; and Tommy, the youngest. Uncle Sid and Cousin Lily live with the family. Sid keeps proposing to Lily, but she refuses, ostensibly because he once got involved with a bad woman; his not-so-secret drinking is the real problem. Sid travels to his new job in Waterbury.

At graduation, Richard drops his valedictory speech and Nat reads it. Nat turns a burst of applause into a final acclamation, forestalling Richard’s planned Marxist call to arms. After the ceremony, Nat asks if Richard’s conscience will allow him to drive the family’s Stanley Steamer. Of course, he  is thrilled and asks Muriel to come along.

On the morning of the Fourth, the street explodes in fireworks. The fired Uncle Sid reappears, but says that he has the day off. Lily hints that she would accept a proposal now. Sid doesn’t act, and Lily is hurt. Muriel's father storms in, accusing Richard of corrupting his daughter's morals. He gives Nat the letters and a farewell letter from Muriel, then threatens to pull his advertising, and storms out.

“Samples of the new freedom,” Nat says, showing Richard’s letters to Sid, who reads aloud a stanza from Swinburne’s Laus Veneris. He stops and they both read silently. “Hail and Hallelujah!” Nat whispers. However, he is truly concerned. He tells Richard about Macomber’s visit; Shocked, Richard reassures his father: He plans to marry Muriel. When Richard reads the letter, he is heartbroken: “Geewhillickers!” he sobs, and bursts into tears.

Mildred goes to a box social, Nat and Sid go to a men’s club picnic, the women go to a hen party, and lovelorn Richard walks and walks. Arthur’s friend Wint asks Richard to go on a double date with “a couple of swift babies” that night. The family reassembles at supper. Sid, who was given back his old job at Nat's newspaper, is drunk again and can barely stand. At the table, he has everyone laughing; but when he goes up for a nap, Lily says that they all encourage him — and maybe they should not. Richard blames women for driving men to drink and marches out to meet Wint.

In a hotel bar, Wint has disappeared and Richard is sitting with Belle, a floozy. His innocence is painfully obvious. At Belle’s nod, the bartender slips something into Richard’s sloe gin fizz. A customer tells the bartender that Richard is underage, he throws him out. When he learns he is the son of a newspaper editor, he throws Belle out. Richard comes home drunk and miserable, declaiming: "But he does not win who plays with Sin In the secret House of Shame." Horrified, Essie assumes the worst. Sid takes charge.

On the next evening, Muriel and Richard meet. She explains that her father made her write the letter. They finally kiss and Richard sighs, “Gosh, I Love You.” Richard returns home, transported. "That’s love, not liquor", Nat reassures Essie. Nat and Richard have s serious talk, about the fact that "no woman wants to give her love to a stupid drunk" and about women like Belle, "whited sepulchers" who can "ruin your whole life." Nat gives him a punishment that is no hardship—go to Yale and stick with it.

Sid and Lily are in the swing, drinking lemonade (Sid spikes it.) Mildred and Art are walking with their sweethearts.  Macomber is reconciled. "We are completely surrounded by love," Nat says. Richard kisses his parents and goes out to gaze blissfully at the moon. Nat quotes the Rubaiyat "Ah, that Spring should vanish with the rose...Spring isn’t everything", he says to Essie. "There's a lot to be said for Autumn.. and Winter, if you're together."

Cast
 Wallace Beery as Sidney Miller
 Lionel Barrymore as Nat Miller
 Aline MacMahon as Lily Davis
 Eric Linden as Richard 'Dick' Miller
 Cecilia Parker as Muriel McComber
 Spring Byington as Essie Miller
 Mickey Rooney as Tommy Miller
 Charley Grapewin as Mr. Dave MacComber
 Frank Albertson as Arthur Miller
 Edward J. Nugent as Wint Selby
 Bonita Granville as Mildred Miller
 Helen Flint as Belle
 Helen Freeman as Miss Hawley
 Tom Dugan as George, the bartender (uncredited)
 Eily Malyon as Norah, the Miller's servant (uncredited)
 Edward LeSaint as Minister (uncredited)

See also
 Lionel Barrymore filmography

References

External links

 
 
 
 

1935 films
1930s historical comedy films
American black-and-white films
American films based on plays
American historical comedy films
American coming-of-age comedy films
Films based on works by Eugene O'Neill
Films directed by Clarence Brown
Films scored by Herbert Stothart
Films set in 1906
Films set in Connecticut
Films shot in Massachusetts
Independence Day (United States) films
Metro-Goldwyn-Mayer films
Films scored by Edward Ward (composer)
1930s English-language films
1930s American films